Shenzhen Metro is the metro system that serves the city of Shenzhen in Guangdong Province of the People's Republic of China. It is operated by the state-owned Shenzhen Metro Group (SZMC) except Line 4 which is run by MTR Corporation (Shenzhen). It was the seventh metro system to be built in mainland China; and having delivered 1297 million rides in 2016, it is one of the busiest metro systems in the world.

The current Shenzhen Metro system consists of fifteen lines:

 Line 1: Luohu – Airport East
 Line 2: Chiwan – Liantang
 Line 3: Futian Bonded Area – Shuanglong
 Line 4: Futian Checkpoint – Niuhu
 Line 5: Chiwan – Huangbeiling
 Line 6: Science Museum – Songgang
 Line 6 Branch: Guangming – SIAT
 Line 7: Xili Lake – Tai'an
 Line 8: Liantang – Yantian Road
 Line 9: Qianwan – Wenjin
 Line 10: Futian Checkpoint – Shuangyong Street
 Line 11: Bitou – Gangxia North
 Line 12: Zuopaotai East – Waterlands Resort East
 Line 14: Gangxia North – Shatian
 Line 16: Universiade – Tianxin
 Line 20: Airport North – Convention & Exhibition City

Below is a list of Shenzhen Metro stations in operation sorted by lines.

Line 1

Line 2 & Line 8

Line 3

Line 4

Line 5

Line 6

 M - main line services (Before 11:00 PM)
 S1 - Short line services 1 (From 11:00 PM to 11:30 PM)
 S2 - Short line services 2 (From 11:00 PM to 11:30 PM)

Line 6 Branch

Line 7

Line 9

Line 10

Line 11

Line 12

Line 14

Line 16

Line 20

Notes

External links

 SZMC (Shenzhen Metro Group) official website 
 MTR Corporation (Shenzhen) official website 

Shenzhen Metro
Shenzhen
Shenzhen